Cape Cod Potato Chips is an American snack food company best known for their brand of kettle-cooked potato chips. The company is headquartered in Hyannis, Massachusetts, on Cape Cod. Cape Cod Potato Chips is a brand owned by Campbell Soup Company since 2018.

History 
Cape Cod Potato Chips was founded in 1980 by Steve Bernard and his brother, Jude, with the idea of offering healthier foods made with little processing. Steve's wife, Lynn had opened the store, "Ardklin Natural Foods", in Harwich in the 1970s. Bernard lamented the lack of healthy snacks. He pursued adding potato chips to the mix after tasting a natural potato chip from a successful company based in Hawaii. In 1980, he sold his auto parts business in for a potato chip business. He bought an  storefront in Hyannis, Massachusetts, in a prime place to reach tourists, as well as an industrial potato slicer for $3,000. He had almost no knowledge of the snack food business other than what he learned in a week-long course on potato chip making at Martin's Potato Chips in Thomasville, Pennsylvania.

Unlike typical commercial brands made using a continuous frying process, in which potato slices travel through a tub of oil on a conveyor belt, Cape Cod chips are cooked in batches in kettles, frying them in a shallow vat in oil while stirring with a rake, producing a crunchier chip. Snack Food Association president James A. McCarthy noted that Bernard "didn't invent the kettle chip, but he was involved in bringing it back to prominence." Before the 1920s, this was the way potato chips had been made.

The company struggled for months after it opened on July 4, 1980. The following winter a car crashed through the front window of the store, just missing Steve's daughter and wife. An insurance payment and publicity from the accident helped tide the company over until the following summer, by which time sales were substantial, and the company's chips were being sold through a number of supermarket chains.

The company was acquired by Anheuser-Busch in 1985, and operated as a division of its Eagle Snacks unit. Sales of the chips were up to 80,000 bags a day by the end of the following year, reaching the entire East Coast, with sales of $16 million annually. Bernard bought the company and its factory back from Anheuser-Busch in 1996. Snack food company Lance Inc. bought the company from Bernard in 1999, by which time annual sales had reached $30 million. In 2010, Lance Inc. merged with Snyder's of Hanover. The Campbell Soup Co. would later go on to acquire Snyder's of Hanover in December 2017.

In popular culture

Phoebe Buffay-Hannigan (Lisa Kudrow), a fictional character on the popular US television sitcom Friends (1994–2004), is seen eating a bag of Cape Cod Chip's white cheddar popcorn in 1999 on Episode 21, Season Six ("The One Where Ross Meets Elizabeth's Dad").

Japanese jazz pianist Hiromi Uehara recorded a composition titled "Cape Cod Chips" on her 2009 solo piano album Place to Be.

In the spring of 2012, Cape Cod Potato Chips launched a television commercial starring a band of computer-generated seagulls performing A Flock of Seagulls' 1982 hit "I Ran (So Far Away)". This was the first commercial made for television by the company.

On the Lil Wayne mixtape Sorry 4 the wait 2 in the song "No Haters" Cape Cod Chips are referenced in the lyrics "Pockets lookin' like the Blob, chips like Cape Cod"

See also

 List of popcorn brands

References

Sources
 
 </ref>
 Lance inc Announces Agreement with Cape Cod Potato Chips

 How Potato Chips Stack Up<ref>

External links
 
 Virtual Factory Tour

Snack food manufacturers of the United States
Companies based in Massachusetts
Massachusetts cuisine
Barnstable, Massachusetts
Products introduced in 1980
Lance Inc. brands
Popcorn brands
Brand name potato chips and crisps